The Institute for Macedonian language "Krste Misirkov" (Institut za makedonski jazik „Krste Misirkov“) is the regulatory body of the Macedonian language and is a part of Ss. Cyril and Methodius University of Skopje, North Macedonia. The institute was established in March 1953 in order to standardise the Macedonian language and to organise creative potentials in the sphere of Macedonian studies. It is also used to ensure professional training and improvement towards those teaching the language. It was then that the Act of the Ministry of Education of the Government of the then Socialist Republic of Macedonia for transforming the Department of the Macedonian Language and Literature at the Institute of Folklore into an autonomous Institute of the Macedonian Language was empowered. At first the Institute functioned as a component part of the Faculty of Philosophy, but soon it turned into a separate scholarly institution with independent financing.

Departments
Today, the Institute consists of 5 scholarly departments:
 Department of the history of the Macedonian language
 Department of contemporary Macedonian
 Department of dialectology
 Department of Macedonian lexicology and lexicography
 Department of onomastics.

Research fellows from the department of the history of the Macedonian language have been working on the Dictionary of Church-Slavonic project; research fellows from the department of the contemporary Macedonian language have been working on the Intentional Syntax Dictionary of Macedonian Verbs project; research fellows from the department of dialectology have been working on the Macedonian Dialect Atlas; research fellows from the department of Macedonian lexicology and lexicography have been working on the Interpretative Dictionary of the Macedonian Language project and on the subproject Dictionary of Macedonian Folk Poetry; research fellows from the department of onomastics have been working on the Dictionary of Macedonian Family Names project.

At present, the scientific and research activities of the Institute are carried by 33 researchers, 6 of whom are research advisers, 1 senior research fellow, 1 research fellow, 6 assistants, 9 researchers and 9 junior researchers. 9 of them are doctors of science and 15 are masters of science.

See also

 Ss. Cyril and Methodius University of Skopje

External links
 

Macedonian language
Language regulators
Socialist Republic of Macedonia
Ss. Cyril and Methodius University of Skopje
1953 establishments in the Socialist Republic of Macedonia
Research institutes in North Macedonia